An aquatic sill (or an oceanic sill) is a sea floor barrier of relatively shallow depth (tens to hundreds of meters) that restricts water movement between benthic zones of an oceanic basin or lake bottom. There are roughly 400 sills in the Earth's oceans, covering 0.01% of the seafloor. A classic example is the Strait of Gibraltar Gateway between the Mediterranean sea and the Atlantic Ocean.

Formation processes 
Aquatic sills are common in fjords, limiting their water exchange with the ocean. After the last ice age, approximately 18,000 years ago, continental glaciers extended to the continental shelves and created U-shaped glacial valleys, with long narrow openings that rise upward near the outer shelf, thereby creating sills.

Aquatic sills as barriers

Circulation barriers 
Aquatic sills can influence water circulation by restricting the movement of bottom water masses, resulting in partial to total separation of two basins. The restricted water circulation affects temporal variations in salinity and can result in oxygen depletion in deeper water masses.

Biogeographic barriers 
An aquatic sill can be a biogeographic barrier for species between two basins, which commonly include sponges, bryozoans, bivalves, and cold-water corals. These communities tend to develop in highly productive waters, such as upwelling areas, and build non-tropical reefs, or bioherms, around sills.

Notable examples

The Strait of Gibraltar Gateway 
A type example of an aquatic sill is the Strait of Gibraltar Gateway, which connects the Atlantic Ocean to the Mediterranean Sea, separates the Iberian Peninsula in Europe from Morocco in Africa, and limits exchange of deep fauna between the North Atlantic and Mediterranean sea. The sill (~200 m depth) has elevated seabed topography with two "mounts" (Monte Seco and Monte Tartesos) separated by east-west oriented depressions and north-south elevated morphological structures. At the sill, the eastward Atlantic water inflow meets the deep westward Mediterranean outflow. The sill is characterized by rocky seabed, low, muddy sedimentation, and accumulations of reef-forming cold water corals up to 40-m thick. The gateway formed after the Messinian Crisis, 5.96-5.33 million years ago, when the Mediterranean Sea experienced a near complete drought. During the Zanclean Flood that followed, two deep channels (Canal Norte and Sur) were scoured out. During the late Miocene and during the Early Pliocene, a north-south dominated tectonic stress field created pull-apart basins under a transtensional regime, thereby forming the gateway.

Other examples 

Apsheron Threshold
 Camarinal Sill
 Denmark Strait
 Espartel Sill
 Mona Passage

See also
 Beach evolution
 Coastal management and coastal erosion 
 Drop structure, a manmade sill
 Sill (geology)

Reference